Australoechemus is a genus of West African ground spiders that was first described by Günter Schmidt (arachnologist), M. Geisthardt & F. Piepho in 1994.  it contains only two species, both found on the Cape Verde islands: A. celer and A. oecobiophilus.

References

Araneomorphae genera
Gnaphosidae
Spiders of Africa
Taxa named by Günter E. W. Schmidt